Su Qing (born 5 July 1989) is a Chinese actress known for her roles as Zhang Yan in Beauty's Rival in Palace and the antagonist Hitara Erqing in Story of Yanxi Palace.

Career
In 2010, Su first became known for her role as Zhang Yan in the historical drama  Beauty's Rival in Palace.

In 2011, Su played her first lead role in the police drama Great Rescue.

In 2012, Su played supporting roles in the historical drama Allure Snow, as well as period romance melodramas A Beauty in Troubled Times, and Beauties at the Crossfire.

In 2014, Su co-starred in the fantasy historical anthology drama Cosmetology High .

In 2015, Su gained recognition for her role as Xu Pingjun in the historical romance drama Love Yunge from the Desert. The same year she co-starred in the action adventure drama The Lost Tomb.

In 2016, Su played the female lead in the war television series  Tracks in the Snowy Forest, portraying two different roles.

In 2017, Su starred in the television series Fire Protection Special Force Elite , playing an emergency rescue worker. Su later reprised her role in the web films spin-off, Life and Death Rescue and Escape From Fire.

In 2018, Su starred in the historical drama Story of Yanxi Palace. She became widely known for her antagonist role as Erqing in the pan-Asian hit. The same year, she starred in the romance drama Never Gone, and xianxia drama Battle Through the Heavens.

In 2019, Su played one of the female leads, A'zhu in the wuxia drama Demi-Gods and Semi-Devils, based on the novel of the same name by Louis Cha. She also starred in wuxia romance drama The New Version of the Condor Heroes, portraying Lin Chaoying. The same year, Su was cast in the political drama People's Justice as a prosecutor, the sequel to the hit drama In the Name of the People.

Filmography

Film

Television series

Discography

Awards and nominations

References 

1989 births
Living people
People from Hengyang
Actresses from Hunan
21st-century Chinese actresses
Chinese television actresses
Chinese film actresses